The Sanders House is a historic house at 2100 Gaines Street in Little Rock, Arkansas.  It is a two-story brick structure, topped by a gabled tile roof.  Its facade is three bays wide, with a center entrance sheltered by a rounded porch supported by Tuscan columns.  Windows in the side bays are sash, while that above the entrance is a band of four casement windows with Prairie School style.  The house was built in 1917 to a design by local architect Theo Sanders.

The house was listed on the National Register of Historic Places in 1982.

References

Houses on the National Register of Historic Places in Arkansas
Colonial Revival architecture in Arkansas
Houses completed in 1917
Houses in Little Rock, Arkansas
National Register of Historic Places in Little Rock, Arkansas
Historic district contributing properties in Arkansas